The Driftwood Range is a small subrange of the Skeena Mountains of the Interior Mountains, located between the headwaters of Driftwood River and Nilkitkwa River in northern British Columbia, Canada.

Mountains
Mountains within the Driftwood Range include:

Driftwood Peak
Skutsil Knob

References

Driftwood Range in the Canadian Mountain Encyclopedia

Skeena Mountains